Jamie Anthony McGuire (born 13 November 1983) is an English former footballer who played as a midfielder.

Career
McGuire was a member of the Tranmere Rovers youth team squad that won both the Football League Youth Alliance Merit Division and the Lancashire Youth Cup in 2001–02. He never made a senior appearance however, and instead played seven games over two loan spells at Football Conference club Northwich Victoria in 2003. He then moved on to non-league side Cammell Laird. He switched to Droylsden in summer 2007. He moved on to Fleetwood Town in May 2009 for a £2,000 fee. He helped Fleetwood to win the Conference Premier title in 2011–12. On 7 May 2013, he was released by Fleetwood due to the expiry of his contract. McGuire then spent four seasons with Mansfield Town before being released by at the end of the 2016–17 season. He then accepted a coaching role with Mansfield's academy.

On 14 December 2019, Academy coach Jamie McGuire has been placed in caretaker charge of Mansfield.

References

External links

1983 births
Living people
Sportspeople from Birkenhead
English footballers
Association football midfielders
Tranmere Rovers F.C. players
Northwich Victoria F.C. players
Cammell Laird 1907 F.C. players
Droylsden F.C. players
Fleetwood Town F.C. players
Mansfield Town F.C. players
English Football League players
National League (English football) players
Northern Premier League players